TestCrew is a Saudi Arabian engineering provider with its headquarters in Riyadh, Saudi Arabia and offices in GCC.

Background 
TestCrew was founded in 2015, and member of the International Software Testing Qualifications Board (ISTQB) and the TMMi. TestCrew software testing services, including quality control, bug testing, and regression testing.

Since its inception, TestCrew has entered into partnerships with the Ministry of Communications and Information Technology, Bank Albilad, Saudi Payments Network, Dynatrace, Tenable, Atlassian, Neotys, NCC Group, and Atlassian.

TestCrew Work Fields 
TestCrew serves companies that seek software quality and have systems/apps listed in the following technology solutions types Desktop Applications, Digital Gates, APIs, Mobile Applications, IoT Solutions, Telecommunications, Virtual and Augmented Reality Technologies, 3D Printing Applications, Cyber Security, Artificial Intelligence Solutions, Data Analysis, and Games.

References

External links 
 Official website

Saudi Arabian brands
2015 establishments in Saudi Arabia